John Sandoe (10 July 1930 – 29 December 2007) was a British bookseller, and the founder in 1957 of the bookshop John Sandoe Books in what had previously been a poodle parlour on Blacklands Terrace off King's Road, near Sloane Square. The Times called him "one of London's leading independent booksellers".

Early life
John Sandoe was born in Felixstowe on 10 July 1930, the son of a stockbroker and moneylender, and the only child of two only children. He was educated at St Edward's School, Oxford.

Career
Sandoe's main competitor was Heywood Hill in Mayfair.

Regulars included Mary Quant, Keith Richards, Lucian Freud, Chips Channon, Dirk Bogarde and Tom Stoppard.

Personal life
In 1962 he met the Canadian artist Paul Sinodhinos, who became his lifelong partner.

John Sandoe Books still exists in its original location.

References

British booksellers
1930 births
2007 deaths
People educated at St Edward's School, Oxford